John Beke may refer to:
 John Beke (academic administrator) ( 1635), English academic
 John Beke, 1st Baron Beke (died  1303), British peer